Saron is a small genus of caridean prawns from the family Thoridae, which were formerly classified as part of the Hippolytidae, the cleaner shrimps. Some species are kept in the marine aquarium trade. These are common on the reefs of the Indo-Pacific region and it is thought that there may be many more species yet to be described due to the high variability in colour observed.

Species
, the World Register of Marine Species lists four species in the genus Saron:

Saron inermis 
Saron marmoratus 
Saron neglectus 
Saron rectirostris

References

Alpheoidea
Decapod genera